The Rarico River is a river in Mozambique. The river is a tributary of the Lugenda River, itself a tributary of the Ruvuma River. During the Portuguese colonial era, a European expedition — operating on behalf of the Nyassa Company — discovered gold in the Rarico's sandy riverbed.

References 

Rivers of Mozambique